William Thomas Pecora (February 1, 1913 – July 19, 1972) was an American geologist.

Life and career
Willam Thomas Pecora was born on February 1, 1913, in Belleville, New Jersey, son of Cono and Anna (Amabile) Pecora. Both parents were born in southern Italy, in the village of Sant'Arsenio.  Pecora was the ninth of 10 children, four boys and six girls. His family was in the wholesale import business. In 1929, Pecora was awarded the Charles H. K. Halsey Scholarship that provided a $1,000 annual scholarship at Princeton University, where he majored in geology and geologic engineering; he was awarded a bachelor's degree in 1933. After graduation, he stayed on at Princeton as a geology tutor.

In the summer of 1934, he was a field assistant to Erling Dorf, working in Montana on Paleozoic stratigraphy.  Pecora started graduate studies at Harvard University in 1935, concentrating on optical mineralogy and petrography. Pecora  received a grant form the Holden Fund to finance fieldwork in 1937–1939 in the western fringe of the Bear Paw Mountains. His doctoral thesis was a petrologic study of the Boxelder laccolith. He received his Ph.D. from Harvard University in 1940.

Pecora was the United States intercollegiate fencing champion in 1933 and went to Germany at the 1936 Summer Olympics in Berlin as a member of the United States Olympic fencing team, competing in the individual and team foil events. He married Ethelwyn Elizabeth Carter from Franklin County, Kentucky on April 7, 1947. They had two children, William Carter Pecora born in 1949 and Ann Stewart Pecora born in 1953.

In 1949, he started a large-scale geologic mapping program of eight fifteen-minute quadrangles in the Bearpaw Mountains. The first four of these maps was published in 1957 as Miscellaneous Geologic Investigation Maps and the other four were published in bulletins starting in 1960 and ending in 1963.  In 1956, Pecora published a review paper on carbonatites which are carbonate-silicate rocks containing a variety of minerals, including impressive reserve of rare commodities such as titanium, zirconium, and uranium. In a 1962 paper, Pecora concentrated on the carbonatite deposits in the Bearpaw Mountains.

In 1957, Pecora was selected as Chief of the Branch of Geochemistry and Petrology within the United States Geological Survey. He established programs in geochronology, experimental petrology, and mineralogy. In 1961, he returned to research. He was named Chief Geologist in 1964 and a year later was appointed Director of the United States Geological Survey by President Lyndon B. Johnson. As Director, he pressed for programs that would be responsive to emerging national problems, such as investigations of gold resources and off-shore oil and gas exploration. He established the National Center of Earthquake Research in response to problems revealed by the 1964 Alaska earthquake. As Director, he advocated for the creation of a remote sensing satellite that would be used to gather information about the surface of the Earth, which became the Landsat program, the longest-running project for gathering images of Earth from space.  Pecora was director of the USGS when the Astrogeology Research Program began in 1963.

Pecora also addressed the discovery of large oil reserves of oil and gas on the north coast of Alaska in 1968. Under his Direction, the U.S. Geological Survey made a careful study of the geologic aspects of the proposed pipeline route. From 1947 to 1967 he was a member of the United States Civil Service Commission's Board of Examiners for Geology, concerned with the development and maintenance of standards in the selection of geologists for federal employment. He was an active member of the Survey's Pick and Hammer shows, which were presented annually to make fun of top Survey managers. In 1970, Pecora expressed his opposition to burying the Trans-Alaska Pipeline System, as it would be unsafe to place an underground pipeline in Arctic land He was appointed to serve as Undersecretary of the United States Department of Interior by President Richard Nixon on April 1, 1971.

He died at age 59 on July 19, 1972 at George Washington University Hospital after having surgery for diverticulitis the previous month. A statement from President Nixon called him "a remarkable civil servant and an internationally respected figure in the scientific community".

The mineral pecoraite was named for him, as was the Pecora Escarpment in Antarctica.

William T. Pecora Award
The William T. Pecora Award was established in 1974 to honor Pecora, and is sponsored jointly by the Department of the Interior and the National Aeronautics and Space Administration (NASA). It is presented annually to individuals or groups that make outstanding contributions toward understanding the Earth by means of remote sensing.

Awards and honors
 1964 – President, Geological Society of Washington
 1965 – Fellow, American Academy of Arts and Sciences
 1965 – Fellow, United States National Academy of Sciences
 1968 – President, Cosmos Club
 1968 – Distinguished Service Award, Department of the Interior
 1969 – Doctorate of Science, Franklin and Marshall College
 1969 – Rockefeller Public Service Award
 1970 – Member, American Philosophical Society
 1970 – Doctorate of Engineering, Colorado School of Mines
 1972 – Public Service Award, American Association of Petroleum Geologists
 1973 – a 6,000 foot ridge in the Bear Paw Mountains was named Pecora Ridge in honor of Pecora.
 Fellow and Councilor, Geological Society of America
 Fellow and Councilor, Mineralogical Society of America
 A Conference and Award are named in his honor.

Publications
 Pecora, William T. "Structure and Petrology of the Boxelder laccolith, Bearpaw Mountains, Montana" Geological Society of America Bulletin, vol.52, no.6, pp. 817–853, Jun 1941
 Pecora, William T. and S.W. Hobbs, "Nickel-gold deposit near Mount Vernon, Skagit County, Washington" US Geological Survey Bulletin No. 931-D, pp. 57–78 (1941)
 Pecora, William T. and S.W. Hobbs, "Nickel deposit near Riddle, Douglas County, Oregon" " US Geological Survey Bulletin No. 931-I, pp. 205–226 (1942)
 Pecora, William Thomas "Nepheline-syenite pegmatites in the Bearpaw Mountains of Montana" American Mineralogist, vol. 24, no. 3, pp. 191, Mar 1939
 Pecora, William Thomas and Bernard Fisher, "Cenozoic geologic history of the Bearpaw Mountains, Montana" Geological Society of America Bulletin, vol.52, no.12, Part 2, pp. 1926–1927, Dec 1941
 Pecora, William T, "Nickel-silicate and associated nickel- cobalt-manganese-oxide deposits near Sao Jose do Tocantins, Goiaz, Brazil" US Geological Survey Bulletin, No. 0935-E, pp. 247–305, 1944
 Brown, Roland Wilbur and William Thomas Pecora, "Paleocene and Eocene strata in the Bearpaw Mountains, Montana" Science, vol.109, no.2837, pp. 487–489, May 1949
 Pecora, William T; Barbosa, Aluizio Licinio de M; Klepper, M R, "Mica deposits in Minas Gerais, Brazil" US Geological Survey Bulletin, No. 0964-C, pp. 205–305, 1950
 Bannerman, Harold MacColl; Pecora, William Thomas "Training geologists; a United States Geological Survey viewpoint" US Geological Survey Circular, No. 73, 6 pp., 1950
 Lindberg, Marie Louise; Pecora, W T, "Tavorite and barbosalite; two new phosphate minerals from Minas Gerais, Brazil" Science, vol.119, no.3099, pp. 739, 1954
 Lindberg, Marie Louise; Pecora, W T, "Avelinoite, a new hydrous sodium ferric phosphate mineral from Minas Gerais, Brazil" Science, vol.120, no.3130, pp. 1074–1075, 1954
 Pecora, William Thomas, "Carbonatites; a review" Geological Society of America Bulletin, vol.67, no.11, pp. 1537–1555, Nov 1956
 Pecora, William Thomas, "Coesite craters and space geology" Geotimes, vol.5, no.2, pp. 16–19, 1960
 Schmidt, Robert George; Pecora, W T; Hearn, B C, Jr, "Geology of the Cleveland Quadrangle, Bearpaw Mountains, Blaine County, Montana" US Geological Survey Bulletin, No. 1141-P, pp. P1–P26, 1964
 Pecora, William T, "Surveying the Earth's resources from space" Surveying and Mapping, vol.27, no.4, pp. 639–643, 1967
 Pecora, William T,  "Geologic applications of earth orbital satellites " Contained in "Space exploration and applications; Vol. 1" from the United Nations Conference on The Exploration and Peaceful Uses of Outer Space, Vienna, Austria, 1968. pp. 634–644. 1969

References

Additional sources 
 Memorial of William Thomas Pecora February 1, 1913–July 19, 1972
 Biographical Memoirs by National Academy of Sciences (U.S.) pp. 371–392 accessed in Google Books, January 9, 2009

External links
 Portrait of William Thomas Pecora via the US Geological Survey
 Photograph of William Thomas Pecora via the US Geological Survey

1913 births
1972 deaths
20th-century American geologists
Harvard University alumni
Members of the United States National Academy of Sciences
People from Belleville, New Jersey
Princeton University alumni
Fencers at the 1936 Summer Olympics
Olympic fencers of the United States
American people of Italian descent
United States Geological Survey personnel
Fellows of the Geological Society of America
American male foil fencers
Members of the American Philosophical Society